Piers Butler, 8th Earl of Ormond, 1st Earl of Ossory (1539) also known as Red Piers (Irish Piers Ruadh), was from the Polestown branch of the Butler family of Ireland. In the succession crisis at the death of Thomas Butler, 7th Earl of Ormond he succeeded to the earldom as heir male, but lost the title in 1528 to Thomas Boleyn. He regained it after Boleyn's death in 1538.

Birth and origins 

Piers was born , the third son of James Butler and Sabh Kavanagh. His father was Lord Deputy of Ireland, Lord of the Manor of Advowson of Callan (1438–1487). His father's family was the Polestown cadet branch of the Butler dynasty that had started with Sir Richard Butler of Polestown, second son of James Butler, 3rd Earl of Ormond.

His mother, whose first name is variously given as Sabh, Sadhbh, Saiv, or Sabina, was a Princess of Leinster, eldest daughter of Donal Reagh Kavanagh, MacMurrough (1396–1476), King of Leinster.

Marriage and children 
In 1485, Butler married Lady Margaret FitzGerald, daughter of Gerald fitz Maurice FitzGerald, 8th Earl of Kildare and Alison FitzEustace. The marriage was political; arranged with the purpose of healing the breach between the two families. In the early years of their marriage, Margaret and her husband were reduced to penury by James Dubh Butler, a nephew, heir to the earldom and agent of the absentee 7th Earl, who resided in England. Piers Butler retaliated by murdering James Dubh in an ambush in 1497. He was pardoned for his crime on 22 February 1498.

 
Piers and Margaret had three sons:
 James (1496–1546), also called "the Lame", who succeeded him as the 9th Earl and married Lady Joan FitzGerald, daughter and heiress of James FitzGerald, 10th Earl of Desmond
 Richard (1500–1571), who became the 1st Viscount Mountgarret and married his first cousin Eleanor Butler, daughter of his uncle Theobald Butler
 Thomas, who was slain by Dermoid Mac Shane, MacGillaPatrick of Upper Ossory, and left an only daughter Margaret, who was first married to Rory O'Moore of Laois and secondly to Sir Maurice Fitzgerald of Lackagh

–and six daughters:
Margaret, married firstly to Thomas, second son of the Earl of Desmond, and secondly to Barnaby Fitzpatrick, 1st Baron Upper Ossory and had issue.
 Catherine (1506–1553) married 1stly Richard Power, 1st Baron Power, of Curraghmore (died 1535) and 2ndly James FitzGerald, 13th Earl of Desmond.
 Joan (born 1528), married James Butler, 10th Baron Dunboyne
 Ellice (1481–1530). Married firstly to MacMorrish; and secondly in 1503 to Gerald Fitzgerald, 3rd Lord Decies (1482–1533), grandson of James FitzGerald, 6th Earl of Desmond.
 Eleanor, married Thomas Butler, 1st Baron Cahir
 Helen, also called Ellen (1523–1597), married Donough_O'Brien,_2nd_Earl_of_Thomond, son of Conor O'Brien, Prince of Thomond, and Annabell de Burgh

The Earl had an illegitimate son, Edmund Butler, who became Archbishop of Cashel and conformed to the established religion in 1539.

Claims to the title 
During the prolonged absence from Ireland of the earls, his father Sir James Butler (died 1487) had laid claim to the Ormond land and titles. This had precipitated a crisis in the Ormond succession when the seventh earl later died without a male heir. On 20 March 1489, King Henry VII appointed him High Sheriff of County Kilkenny. He was knighted before September 1497. The following year (1498) he seized Kilkenny Castle and with his wife, Margaret FitzGerald (died 1542), the dynamic daughter of the earl of Kildare, probably improved the living accommodation there. On 28 February 1498 he received a pardon for crimes committed in Ireland, including the murder of James Ormonde, heir to the 7th Earl. He was also made Seneschal of the Liberty of Tipperary on 21 June 1505, succeeding his distant relation, James Butler, 9th Baron Dunboyne. On the death of Thomas Butler, 7th Earl of Ormonde on 3 August 1515, Piers Butler became the 8th Earl of Ormond. On 6 March 1522, the King appointed him Chief Governor of Ireland as Lord Deputy; he held this office until 13 May 1524 when he became Lord Treasurer.

Loss of title 
One of the heirs general to the Ormond inheritance was Thomas Boleyn, whose mother was Margaret Butler, second daughter of the 7th earl. Thomas Boleyn was the father of Anne, whose star was rising at the court of King Henry VIII of England. As the king wanted the titles of Ormond and Wiltshire for Thomas Boleyn, he induced Butler and his coheirs to resign their claims on 18 February 1528. Aided by the king's Chancellor, Cardinal Thomas Wolsey, Butler was created Earl of Ossory instead.

Restoration of title 
On 22 February 1538, the earldom of Ormond was restored to him.

Death and timeline 
He died on 26 August 1539 and was buried in St Canice's Cathedral, Kilkenny.

Ancestry

See also 
 Butler dynasty
 Ashfield Gales

Notes and references

Notes

Citations

Sources 

  – 1534 to 1558
 
 
 
  – N to R (for Ormond)
 
  – (Snippet view) 
  – (PDF downloadable from given URL)
  – (for timeline)
 
  – To the Close of the Tudor Period (date of reprint unknown)
  – Viscounts

Further reading 
  – (Preview)

 

1460s births
1539 deaths
15th-century Irish people
16th-century Irish people
Piers
Earls of Ormond (Ireland)
High Sheriffs of County Kilkenny
Lords Lieutenant of Ireland
People of the Tudor period

Year of birth uncertain